R Aaravin is a Singaporean footballer who plays for Home United FC as a defender. He was promoted by Philippe Aw to the 1st team squad in 2016. He started playing in the 1st team when he is playing in the prime league team.

He was part of the Lion City Cup alumnus with Adam Swandi.

He also won The New Paper Dollah Kassim Award in 2012.

Club career

Home United
He was released by the NFA U18 team after enlisting in NS. There, he signed for Home United prime league squad and was trusted by the coach then, Philippe Aw. His first game was against the Young Lions (Home won 2-0).

Career statistics

References

Singaporean footballers
1996 births
Living people
Singaporean people of Tamil descent
Singaporean sportspeople of Indian descent
Association football defenders
Home United FC players